Marián Filc (16 September 1948 — 9 February 1993) was a Slovak figure skater who competed for Czechoslovakia. He placed tenth at the 1968 Winter Olympics. His coach was Hilda Múdra.

Filc later worked as a dentist in Austria. While recovering from the flu, he suffered a heart attack and died. He was the brother of hockey player and coach Ján Filc.

Competitive highlights

References

Slovak male single skaters
Czechoslovak male single skaters
Olympic figure skaters of Czechoslovakia
Figure skaters at the 1968 Winter Olympics
Universiade medalists in figure skating
1948 births
1993 deaths
Figure skaters from Bratislava
Universiade silver medalists for Czechoslovakia
Competitors at the 1968 Winter Universiade